USS Curlew (MSC(O)-8/AMS-8/YMS-218) was a  built for the United States Navy during World War II. She was the fourth U.S. Navy ship to be named for the curlew.

History
Laid down, 18 July 1942 by the J. N. Martinac Shipbuilding Co. of Tacoma, Washington; Launched, 23 December 1942; Completed and commissioned USS YMS-218, 23 June 1943.

She served in the Asiatic-Pacific Theater during World War II, and took part in occupation activities in late 1945 and early 1946.

In early 1947, after returning to the U.S. West Coast, she was placed out of commission. YMS-218 was reclassified as a Motor Minesweeper, AMS-8 and named USS Curlew, 18 February 1947. Curlew recommissioned in June 1949.

Curlew was sent to the Western Pacific a year later to support Korean War operations. During most of that conflict, she was active in the combat zone, performing mine clearance and blockade missions. Curlew remained in the Japan-Korea area after the war ended in mid-1953. She was redesignated a Coastal Minesweeper (Old), MSC(O)-8, 7 February 1955.

Curlew was transferred to South Korea on 6 January 1956 as ROKS Geumhwa (MSC 519). Returned from South Korea, the veteran minesweeper was struck from the Naval Vessel Register on 15 November 1974, and was disposed of about 1977.

References

External links
 
 

YMS-1-class minesweepers of the United States Navy
Ships built in Tacoma, Washington
1942 ships
World War II minesweepers of the United States
Korean War minesweepers of the United States
Ships transferred from the United States Navy to the Republic of Korea Navy